Bucovăț (Moldovan Cyrillic: Буковэц) is a town in Strășeni district, Moldova. One village is administered by the town, Rassvet.

References

Cities and towns in Moldova
Strășeni District